Quimarumi (possibly from Ancash Quechua kima three, rumi stone, "three stones"), also known as Minas (Spanish for mines), is a  mountain in the Cordillera Blanca in the Andes of Peru. It is located in the Ancash Region, Huaraz Province, Huaraz District. Quimarumi lies on a ridge between the Quilcayhuanca valley and the Shallap valley, northwest of Carhuascancha and northeast of Qullapaqu.

References

Mountains of Peru
Mountains of Ancash Region